Oleg Ogorodov (Олег Огородов; born 16 July 1972) is a former tennis player, who turned professional in 1995. He represented Uzbekistan at the 1996 Summer Olympics in Atlanta, Georgia. His career high singles rank came on May 13, 1996, when he was ranked 101st in men's singles tennis rankings. Alternatively in doubles his career high came a year later on July 7, 1997, when he ranked 102nd.

Career
Ogorodov officially turned pro in 1995 and made his first singles appearance on the Association of Tennis Professionals (ATP) challenger series tour in July. During his first appearance in Weiden, Germany he made it to the quarterfinal but lost to Swedish tennis player Thomas Johansson in three sets, 7–6, 1–6, 5–7. He would make it to his first challenger semifinal the following week in Eisenach, Germany when lost to Polish tennis player Wojtek Kowalski in straight sets, 6–7, 3–6. In July 1995 Ogorodov made his first ATP tour appearance in Prague, Czech Republic however he lost in the first round to Simon Touzil, 4–6, 4–6. October 1995 he made into his first ATP tour quarterfinal in Vienna, Austria losing against Belgian player Filip Dewulf, 3–6, 1–6, Dewulf later on to win the tournament against Thomas Muster. During his play in Vienna he gained one of his biggest victories to date by beating Ukrainian player and number 4 seed Andriy Medvedev who was ranked 16th in the world at the time in straight sets, 6–3, 6–1.

Career finals

Doubles (1 title)

References

External links
  
 
 

1972 births
Living people
Uzbekistani male tennis players
Tennis players at the 1996 Summer Olympics
Olympic tennis players of Uzbekistan
Sportspeople from Tashkent
Uzbekistani people of Russian descent
Asian Games medalists in tennis
Hopman Cup competitors
Tennis players at the 1994 Asian Games
Tennis players at the 1998 Asian Games
Tennis players at the 2002 Asian Games
Asian Games bronze medalists for Uzbekistan
Medalists at the 1998 Asian Games
Medalists at the 2002 Asian Games